The South Africa Just Energy Transition Investment Plan (JET-IP) is a $8.5bn deal to help South Africa (ZA) decarbonise its economy, struck at COP26 in 2021. It is a cooperation between the governments of ZA, France, Germany, the United Kingdom, the United States and the European Union.

References 

Fourth Merkel cabinet
COP26